2018 Ventforet Kofu season.

J2 League

References

External links
 J.League official site

Ventforet Kofu
Ventforet Kofu seasons